Madeleine Swann is a character in the James Bond films Spectre (2015) and No Time to Die (2021), played by actress Léa Seydoux. She is the second Bond girl to appear in two films and first in the film series to have a child with Bond.

Character biography
Madeline Swann is the daughter of Mr. White (Jesper Christensen), a member of the criminal organization SPECTRE. As a young child in Norway, Swann witnessed the death of her mother at the hands of Lyutsifer Safin (Rami Malek), who murdered her mother as vengeance for Mr. White killing Safin's entire family under orders from Ernst Stavro Blofeld (Christoph Waltz). Swann shoots Safin with her father's gun in self-defense and drags him outside, but when Safin unexpectedly regains consciousness, a terrified Swann flees onto a nearby frozen lake and collapses through the ice. Safin watches her from above the ice for a moment before pulling her up and saving her life.

Swann studied in Doctors Without Borders and eventually grew up to become a psychiatrist. By the time of Spectre she is working in a private clinic in the Austrian Alps. 

After being lethally poisoned by Blofeld, White tells James Bond (Daniel Craig) to protect his daughter from SPECTRE, so Bond goes to see her at the clinic. Although Swann is initially hesitant to trust Bond, she agrees to share information about SPECTRE and help Bond take the organization down. The two gradually fall in love, and Bond ultimately leaves MI6 to be with her after arresting Blofeld. 

In No Time to Die, Bond and Swann travel to Matera, Italy. Swann suggests Bond visit Vesper Lynd's (Eva Green) grave to get closure in his deceased lover's death. Bond does so, and while there notices a card placed by the side of the grave with the SPECTRE symbol. As he picks it up, a bomb detonates, and SPECTRE agents ambush him. Bond escapes, but hears a message from Blofeld on Swann's phone thanking her for her help setting Bond up. Believing she has betrayed him, Bond leaves her at a train station, declaring that they will never see each other again. 

Five years later, Swann is now serving as a psychiatrist at Belmarsh Prison, and is the only doctor Blofeld will speak to. Safin, still seeking revenge for his family, visits Swann and tries to coerce her into assassinating Blofeld with nanobot weaponry developed by rogue MI-6 scientist Valdo Obruchev (David Dencik). Swann refuses, but he manages to put the nanobots on her person without her knowing, and she passes them on to Bond when they reunite to track down Safin. Bond interrogates Blofeld, who gloats that he framed Swann for trying to kill him; an enraged Bond tries to strangle Blofeld, unintentionally infecting with the nanobots and killing him. 

Later, Bond and Swann reconcile when he tracks her to her childhood home. Bond meets her five-year-old daughter, Mathilde, but Swann denies that she is his child. Safin, having become obsessed with Swann, kidnaps her and Mathilde and brings them to his island fortress. Bond is able to kill Safin and rescue Madeline and Mathilde, but he is infected with Safin's nanotechnology in the process. Because the nanotechnology would kill Swann and Mathilde if they were ever exposed to it, Bond decides to sacrifice himself by staying behind on Safin's island as MI-6 missiles hurtle toward it. Before he dies, Bond tells Swann that he loves her and Mathilde, and Swann confirms that he is in fact Mathilde's father. The film ends with Madeline driving Bond's black Aston Martin V8 with Mathilde in Italy and telling her the story of a man named "Bond, James Bond."

Production
The filmmakers originally looked for a "blonde, Scandinavian" actress to play the part of Swann, before casting their net wider to include French and German actresses as well, whereupon they chose Seydoux.

Madeleine Swann's name is a tribute to Marcel Proust: Volume 1 of Proust's In Search of Lost Time is called Swann's Way, and it includes an episode in which the narrator enjoys a madeleine.

Unlike most Bond girls, Madeline Swann was a full-fledged love interest for James Bond that appeared in multiple films. Prior to Swann, Bond had fallen in love with only Tracy di Vicenzo in On Her Majesty's Secret Service, and Vesper Lynd in Casino Royale. Both Tracy and Vesper die early in their relationships with Bond, and this reoccurring tragic outcome was used to create tension in No Time to Die regarding Swann's fate. Ultimately, the trope is subverted when Bond himself dies instead of Swann.

Reception
Lea Seydoux received positive reviews for her portrayal of Swann. British Vogue said "the French actor’s capable and complex creation was [a] perfect match" for Daniel Craig's Bond. Seydoux was nominated for a 2016 Teen Choice Awards in the "Choice Movie Actress: Action" category for her portrayal of Swann in Spectre. Screen Rant called Madeline Swann the "bravest" Bond girl in the franchise.

Evaluation
Thomas Lethbridge  suggests that Bond's relationship with Swann parallels his earlier romance with Vesper Lynd in Casino Royale: "In both films, Bond seemingly finds himself in a relatively happy relationship, before it all comes crashing down as a result of apparent betrayal." John L. Flynn and Bob Blackwood suggest that Bond's relationship with Swann is a very modern one: "Daniel Craig's interpretation of a more modern 007 may well help dissipate Bond's outmoded, chauvinistic approach to love and relationships, and establish more complicated and thus more realistic relationships with his leading ladies in the new millennium."

Mary Rose Somarriba describes Swann as a "near match, if not equal, to Bond in combat, assassination know-how, and intellect." Sommariba goes on to say,
Far from a one-dimensional character, Swann is remarkably multifaceted in her strength and smarts. Perhaps most striking is not her being equal to her male counterpart but instead what makes her different. There’s one way in which Swann is superior to Bond, and that is in how she sees beyond the assassin's life—she sees it as ultimately lacking and wants more. Swann is highly educated as a doctor in psychology, and despite being trained in combat by her father, she prefers to live far away from things that would tempt her back to that life, hence her station in the Austrian Alps at a private medical clinic.

Notes

References

Bond girls
Film characters introduced in 2015
Fictional psychiatrists
Female characters in film
Fictional female doctors
Fictional French people
Fictional Norwegian people